John Colgan, OFM (Irish Seán Mac Colgan; c. 1592 – 15 January 1658), was an Irish Franciscan friar noted as a hagiographer and historian.

Life

Colgan was born c. 1592 at Priestown near Carndonagh. He joined the Franciscan Order and was sent to study in the Irish Franciscan College of St. Anthony of Padua in Leuven (Irish: Lúbhán, French and historically in English: Louvain) in present-day Belgium in 1612.  He was ordained as a priest in 1618. Here he is said to have acted as professor of theology for some time, but he soon forsook the professorial chair to devote himself to the Irish studies for which that college was famous.

Father Hugh Ward (d. 1635) had projected a complete history of the Irish saints, and for this purpose had sent some of his brethren, notably Michael O'Clery, to Ireland to collect materials. Ward died before he could make any progress in his work, but the materials that had been gathered remained. Colgan, being a competent master of the Irish language, had thus ready at hand an excellent collection of manuscripts of Irish hagiology.

He undertook a great work, to be published in six volumes, dealing with the whole range of Irish ecclesiastical history and antiquities. In 1645 he published at Louvain the third volume of this series (Acta Sanctorum Hiberniae, etc.), containing the lives of the Irish saints whose feasts occur in the calendar for the months of January, February, and March. The lives of the saints whose feasts occur in the succeeding months were to have been published in the last three volumes of the series. Luke Wadding, in his Annales Minorum, informs us that the volume dealing with the saints for April, May, and June was in the press at Colgan's death; this seems incorrect, since, if the work had been so far advanced, it would have been published by some colleague.

The second volume of the series, entitled Trias Thaumaturga, etc., appeared at Louvain in 1647. It deals with the three great national saints of Ireland, Patrick, Brigid, and Columbcille. In it are contained seven of the ancient lives of St. Patrick, five of St. Columba, and six of St. Brigid. For a long time the Trias Thaumaturga was nearly the only source of information on St. Patrick, and even since the Whitley Stokes edition of the Vita Tripartita (Rolls Series), Colgan's work cannot be dispensed with. Colgan gives a Latin version of the Vita Tripartita which represents a different text from that edited by Stokes; Colgan's manuscript seems to have entirely disappeared.

Besides the "Lives" in the Trias Thaumaturga, there are also contained in this volume many valuable "Appendices", dealing with the ecclesiastical antiquities of Ireland, and critical and topographical notes, which, though not always correct, are of assistance to the student. In 1655 he published at Antwerp a life of Duns Scotus, in which he undertook to prove that this great Franciscan doctor was born in Ireland, and not in Scotland, as was then frequently asserted. In the Bibliotheca Franciscana Colgan is said to have died in 1647, but this is evidently a mistake, as a note in his work on Duns Scotus proves clearly that he was alive in 1655.

In 1652 Colgan resigned as a professor, dying at St. Anthony's, Leuven, on 15 January 1658.

Works

Colgan's work on Irish hagiology is of undoubted value. Though unfortunately of very weak constitution, he was a man of great ability and industry, and with a sound critical sense. His knowledge of the Irish language enabled him to turn to good account the vast collection of manuscripts (now for the greater part lost) which had been collected at the instigation of Ward, while his acquaintance with the traditions existing among the native Irish of his time, about the various names of persons and places, gave him an advantage over writers of the present day. Colgan, though a fluent Irish speaker, had not, and from the nature of things could not have, a knowledge of the grammatical forms of Old Irish and Middle Irish. Hence his judgments about the dating of the manuscripts and about the meaning of certain difficult expressions ought not to be put forward as irreversible. In other words, Colgan should be judged by the criteria of his time; from this point of view his work on the ecclesiastical history of Ireland is unequalled. But his opinions are not decisive. The Colgan Heritage Weekend is held annually in Carndonagh, Co. Donegal, his home place, at the end of June.

His principal works are: 
Acta Sanctorum Hiberniae (Louvain, 1645). Long title: Acta Sanctorum veteris et majoris Scotiae seu Hibernix, Sanctorum Insulae, partim ex variis per Europam MS. Codicibus exscripta, partim ex antiquis monumentis et probatis Auctoribus eruta et congesta; omnia Notis et Appendicibus illustrata. Tomus primus qui de Sacris Hiberniae Antiquitatibus est tertius, Januarium, Februarium et Martium complectens. 
Acta Triadis Thaumaturgae (Louvain, 1647). Long title: Triadis Thaumaturgae, seu Divorum Patricci Columbae et Brigidae, trium Veteris et Majoris Scotiae, seu Hiberniae, Sanctorum Insulae, communium Patronorum Acta, Tomus Secundus Sacrarum ejusdem Insulae Antiquitatum. 
Tractatus de Vita, Patria, Scriptis Johannis Scoti, Doctoris Subtilis (Antwerp, 1655).

Besides these he left in manuscript: 
De Apostolatu Hibernorum inter exteras Gentes cum Dice Alphabetico de exteris santis (852 pages); 
De Sanctis in Anglia, Britannia, Aremorica, in reliqua Gallia, in Belgio (1068 pages); 
De Sanctis in Lotharingia et Burgundia, in Germania ad senestram et dexteram Rheni, in Italia (920 pages).

Some of these manuscripts are now in University College Dublin and some, though eagerly sought for, have not yet been traced (see Gilbert, National MSS. of Ireland, London, 1884; or Doherty, op. cit. below, 81–82).

References

Attribution

Sources
Wadding-Sbaralea, Scriptores Ordinis Minorum (ed. Rome, 1806; Quaracchi, 1908 sqq.)
Bibliotheca Universa Franciscana (Madrid, 1732)
Ware-Harris, Writers of Ireland (Dublin, 1746)
Doherty, Inis-Owen and Tirconnell, being some account of Antiquities and Writers of the County of Donegal (Dublin, 1895), 49–52, 71–106
Hyde, A Literary History of Ireland (New York, 1902)

1592 births
1658 deaths
People from County Donegal
Irish Friars Minor
17th-century Irish Roman Catholic priests
Christian hagiographers
Irish writers
17th-century Irish historians
Franciscan scholars
Irish expatriates in Belgium
Burials in Flemish Brabant
Irish Latinists